Dorothy Knapp (1907 — 1986) was an American cover artist who designed commercial first day covers.

Biography 
Knapp was an envelope artist and art teacher in Rhinebeck, New York. She designed commercial first day covers (FDC) mainly for Fleetwood, one of the largest FDC publishers. 

Her career started in the late 1930s at the time hand-painted cachets, which were more expensive than the printed cachets, were not widely wanted.  However, Knapp “influenced others to start hand-painting covers, [...] she influenced the style of mid-20th century cachets,” said Douglas Weisz, Knapp's biographer.  In addition to mass-produced designs, she often created small quantities — ten or twelve per stamp issue — of hand-drawn, hand-painted covers.   

Knapp was never a stamp collector belonging to any philatelic organization nor did she subscribe to any philatelic publications. However, her husband was a stamp collector and cover approval dealer.  Cachetmaking “was a way for them to share something together,” said  Weisz. “And when her husband died, she stopped. [...] It wasn’t something they could do together anymore. It wasn’t interesting to her. She did it because of family and love.”

Works and legacy 
Knapp is considered to be one of the most famous cachet artists in the history of philately. “[...] her work has majorly influenced generations of artists who present their designs on envelopes,” said Weisz.

By late 1970s, Knapp's FDCs were selling for a few hundred dollars each. In FDC collecting today, her FDCs typically sell for $200-500 each.

References 

1907 births
1986 deaths
20th-century American artists
20th-century American women educators
20th-century American educators
20th-century American women artists
Schoolteachers from New York (state)
People from Rhinebeck, New York
Artists from New York (state)
American stamp designers
American art educators